The Madurai-Ramnad Diocese is a diocese of Church of South India in Tamil Nadu state of India. The diocese is one among the 24 dioceses of Church of South India.

History
The diocese was one among the initial 14 dioceses already existing at the time of formation of Church of South India in 1947.

About the Diocese
The diocese comprises following six districts  Madurai, Dindigul, Virudhunagar, Theni, Sivagangai, and Ramanathapuram in Tamil Nadu state. The cathedral church of the diocese is situated at Narimedu, Madurai.

Bishops
1947–1959: Lesslie Newbigin
1959–1978: George Devadass
1978–1994: David Gnaniah Pothirajulu
1996–2004: Thavaraj David Eames
2004–2012: Christopher Asir
2013–2022: Marialouis Joseph
2022–present: Jeyasingh Prince Prabhakaran

Notable churches
CSI Cathedral , Narimedu, Madurai 
The Cathedral  at Madurai is the biggest Cathedral in South East Asia, sprawling over a four-acre site which is built in Gothic style combined with architectural elegance, Tamil culture and theological significance. It was built during the Rt. Rev. Dr. David Pothirajulu from donations from across the diocese. It was dedicated on the Easter Day, 30 March 1986 by the then CSI moderator, Rt.Rev.Dr. I. Jesudasan.

Mary Clara Memorial Church, Melur, Madurai District
Abishehanather CSI Church, Sivaganga (North)
C.S.I Webb Memorial Church, Ponnagaram, Madurai

Educational institutions under the diocese
 C.S.I.Bishop Christopher Asir memorial College of Dental Science and Research, Madurai
 C.S.I College of Arts and Science for Women, K.Pudur, Madurai
 C.S.I Jeyaraj Annapackiam College of Nursing & Allied Sciences, Pasumalai, Madurai
 C.S.I Industrial Training Center, Pasumalai, Madurai
 C.S.I College of Education Pasumalai, Madurai-04
 C.S.I.College of Education, Ramnad
 C.S.I. Teacher Training Institute, Batlagundu
 C.S.I. Teacher Training Institute, Thirumangalam, Madurai

See also
 Church of South India
 Tirunelveli Diocese
 Diocese of Madras
 Diocese of Coimbatore
 Christianity in Tamil Nadu
 Diocese of Kanyakumari
 Church of North India
 Christianity in India

References

External links 
  CSI Cathedral Church Madurai

Christianity in Tamil Nadu
Maduari-Ramnad
Christian organizations established in 1947
1947 establishments in India
Madurai district